
Gmina Stargard is a rural gmina (administrative district) in Stargard County, West Pomeranian Voivodeship, in north-western Poland. Its seat is the town of Stargard, although the town is not part of the territory of the gmina.

Until December 31, 2015, gmina was known as Gmina Stargard Szczeciński.

Villages
Gmina Stargard contains the villages and settlements of Barzkowice, Bębnikąt, Domanowo, Golczewo, Golina, Golinka, Grabowo, Grzędzice, Grzędziczki, Kępinka, Kiczarowo, Klępino, Kolonia Dolna-Grabowo, Kolonia Górna Grabowo, Koszewko, Koszewo, Krąpiel, Kurcewo, Lipnik, Luboń, Lubowo, Małkocin, Mężytki, Omięcin, Pęzino, Piaśnik, Piaszcze, Poczernin, Podlesie, Radziszewo, Rogowo, Siwkowo, Skalin, Smogolice, Sowno, Strachocin, Strumiany, Strzyżno, Sułkowo, Święte, Trzebiatów, Tychowo, Ulikowo, Warchlinko, Warchlino, Wierzchląd, Witkowo I, Witkowo II and Żarowo.

Neighbouring gminas
Gmina Stargard is bordered by the town of Stargard and by the gminas of Dolice, Goleniów, Kobylanka, Marianowo, Maszewo, Stara Dąbrowa, Stare Czarnowo, Suchań and Warnice.

References

 Polish official population figures 2006

Stargard Szczecinski
Stargard County